William Jelks "Bill" Cabaniss Jr. (born July 11, 1938) is an American politician and diplomat who served as a member of both chambers of the Alabama Legislature and U.S. Ambassador to the Czech Republic in the George W. Bush Administration.

Early life and education 
Cabaniss graduated with a Bachelor of Arts from Vanderbilt University in 1960 and entered the United States Army, where he served as a First Lieutenant with the Airborne Rangers. He was awarded the Army Commendation Medal in 1964, after a three-year tour of duty in Germany.

Career
After leaving the Army, Cabaniss returned to Birmingham and began his business career with the Southern Cement Company Division of Martin Marietta Corporation. In 1971, he resigned from his position as Director of Market Development with Southern Cement and started his own company, Precision Grinding, Inc., after acquired the assets of a small metal grinding company, which he transformed into a steel plate processing and metal machining business.

Cabaniss, a Republican, served in the Alabama House of Representatives from 1978 to 1982 and the Alabama State Senate from 1982 to 1990. He ran unsuccessfully for the U.S. Senate in the 1990 election, losing to incumbent Democratic Senator Howell Heflin.

References

External links
Official Biography 
Alphabetical List of Chiefs of Mission and Principal Officials, 1778-2005

Living people
1938 births
Businesspeople from Birmingham, Alabama
Republican Party members of the Alabama House of Representatives
Republican Party Alabama state senators
Ambassadors of the United States to the Czech Republic
20th-century American politicians
21st-century American diplomats
Martin Marietta people